Paberžė ('a place by the birch forest', formerly) is a village in Kėdainiai district municipality, in Kaunas County, in central Lithuania. According to the 2011 census, the village had a population of 18 people. It is located by the Liaudė and Nykis confluence, 32 km from Kėdainiai. Surroundings of Paberžė are declared as Paberžė landscape sanctuary.

There are wooden Catholic church of St. Mary, former Paberžė manor (now the Museum of Uprising), rebels' burial ground.

History
In the 18th century Paberžė belonged to nobleman Schilling. He have build a wooden church and manor in the village. After the January Uprising Paberžė was transferred to Russian officer Tikheev.

Demography

Notable people
Antanas Mackevičius, priest who served in the Paberžė church and was one of the main local organizers of the January Uprising.
Algirdas Mykolas Dobrovolskis, known as father Stanislovas, priest who served in the Paberžė church at the end of the 20th century. He was a prominent religious figure during late Soviet era.
Liucija Sereikaitė-Juozonienė, physicist.

Images

References

Villages in Kaunas County
Kėdainiai District Municipality